George Benedict Jumonville (May 17, 1917 in Mobile, Alabama – December 12, 1996 in Mobile, Alabama) was a Major League Baseball player who played infielder from -. He would play for the Philadelphia Phillies.

External links

1917 births
1996 deaths
Major League Baseball infielders
Philadelphia Phillies players
Baseball players from Alabama
Sportspeople from Mobile, Alabama